Gow, GoW, or GOW may refer to:

Entertainment

Gaming
 Gears of War, a third-person shooter series developed for the Xbox 360
 Gears of War (video game), the first game in the Gears of War series
 God of War (series), an action-adventure series for the PlayStation platforms
 God of War (2005 video game), the first game in the God of War series, for the PlayStation 2
 God of War (2018 video game), the eighth game in the series, for the PlayStation 4
 Game of War: Fire Age, an iPhone-based massively multiplayer online game produced in 2013

Other
God of War (DC Comics), a limited six-issue comic book series based around the video game series (Greek mythology era)
God of War (Dark Horse Comics), a limited four-issue series based around the video game series (Norse mythology era)
God of War novel, a 2010 novelization of the first game in the video game series
God of War novel, a 2018 novelization of the 2018 game
Gangs of Wasseypur, a 2012 Indian film directed by Anurag Kashyap

Places
Gow, Iran, a village in Kerman Province
Lesmahagow, Scotland, a town also known as "the Gow"
Mount Gow, Victoria Land, Antarctica
Gow crater, Saskatchewan, Canada, an impact crater
The Gow School
 Gopher Ordnance Works, the ruins of a World War II-era gunpowder factory near Rosemount, Minnesota

People
Gow (surname), people with the surname
Gow (sept), sept of the Scottish Clan MacPherson and Clan Chattan
Gow Fields, mayor of Lakeland, Florida (2009-2014)